The Czech Republic men's national field hockey team represents the Czech Republic in international field hockey competitions and is controlled by the Czech Hockey Federation, the governing body for field hockey in the Czech Republic.

Tournament record
The Czech Republic has never qualified for the World Cup or the Summer Olympics. They competed two times in the EuroHockey Championship where their best result was the eighth place in 2007 and 2013.

European Championships

Hockey World League

*Draws include knockout matches decided on a penalty shoot-out.

Hockey Series

See also
 Czech Republic women's national field hockey team
 Czechoslovakia men's national field hockey team

References

External links
Official website
FIH profile

European men's national field hockey teams
national team
Field hockey